Finno is a settlement in Mandera County, Kenya.

References 

Populated places in North Eastern Province (Kenya)
Mandera County